Richland Creek is a stream in Greene County of the U.S. state of Georgia. It is a tributary to the Oconee River within Lake Oconee.

Richland Creek was so named from the rich farmland along its course.

References

Rivers of Georgia (U.S. state)
Rivers of Greene County, Georgia